Coleophora monstruosa is a moth of the family Coleophoridae.

References

monstruosa
Moths described in 1994